Aframomum makandensis is a species of plant in the ginger family, Zingiberaceae. It was first described by Dhetchuvi.

Range
Aframomum makandensis is native to Gabon.

References 

makandensis